Constable & Robinson Ltd. is an imprint of Little, Brown which publishes fiction and non-fiction books and ebooks.

Founded in Edinburgh in 1795 by Archibald Constable as Constable & Co., and by Nick Robinson as Robinson Publishing Ltd in 1983, is an imprint of Little, Brown, which is owned by Hachette.

History
Constable & Co. was founded in 1795 by Archibald Constable, and became Sir Walter Scott's publisher. In 1897, Constable released the most famous horror novel ever published, Bram Stoker's The Un-Dead, albeit with a last-minute title change to Dracula.

In 1813, the company was the first to give an author advance against royalties. In 1821, it introduced the standard three-decker novel, and in 1826, with the launch of the book series Constable's Miscellany, it became the first publisher to produce mass-market literary editions.

By 1921, it advertised books on the London Underground, another first for a publishing house.

In 1993, Constable & Co. pioneered the series-based Cognitive Behavioural Therapy self-help publishing, and in 2000, they became the first ad-supported, online book publisher. Lastly, in 2013, Constable & Robinson were a key partner in Digital Innovation Contest 2013.

Robinson Publishing Ltd was founded in 1983 by Nick Robinson. The two companies merged in December 1999. Constable & Robinson continue to publish non-fiction books under the Constable imprint and is therefore probably the oldest independent publishing house in the English-speaking world still trading under the name of its founder. In June 2007, Elliot Right Way Books, a successful small publisher of "how-to" titles and the publisher of compendia of speeches by Enoch Powell, came under the umbrella of Constable & Robinson Ltd.

A new fiction imprint, Corsair, was launched in October 2009, dedicated to publishing groundbreaking debut fiction alongside established authors. On the back of its success, the company launched the Canvas imprint in December 2011 to focus on commercial fiction. A bijou imprint of Corsair, Much-in-Little, was launched in April 2012 and will become home to quirky and imaginative new children's and YA fiction.

Constable & Robinson also publishes a non-fiction list including current affairs, history and biography, humour and psychology, as well as crime fiction, and literary fiction in both hardback and paperback. Best known are the longstanding Mammoth paperback list of anthologies and collections, the Overcoming CBT self-help titles, and the history series of Brief Guides and Brief Histories.

Constable & Robinson is the UK publisher of the Agatha Raisin and Hamish Macbeth crime fiction titles by M. C. Beaton.

In 2013, Constable & Robinson created controversy when it responded to a manuscript submission by J. K. Rowling by suggesting that she attend a writing course. The novel, The Cuckoo's Calling, was published by a competitor, reprinted three times, and was adapted for television.

In 2014, Constable & Robinson was purchased by the Little, Brown Book Group.

Awards
In 2011, A Visit from the Goon Squad by Jennifer Egan, published under the Corsair imprint in the UK, won the Pulitzer Prize for Fiction.  In 2012, Constable & Robinson was named the IPG Independent Publisher of the Year, calling it "a publisher on a roll — a rising star in a difficult market". The same year, the company was also named Independent Publisher of the Year at The Bookseller Industry Awards.  Constable & Robinson also won the IPG Trade Publisher of the Year award in 2013.

See also
 Thomas Constable (printer and publisher)

References

External links
 www.constablerobinson.com Archived website
 Little, Brown Book Group
 C&R Crime
 Agatha Raisin

1999 establishments in England
Book publishing companies of the United Kingdom
British companies established in 1999
Companies based in Edinburgh
Companies based in the London Borough of Camden
Publishing companies established in 1999